Quest for Fire: Firestarter, Vol. 1 is the second studio album by Canadian rapper Kardinal Offishall. It was released on MCA Records, his first album for a major label. It is a recompilation album, which includes older songs and demos that he used to get signed. The lead single, "BaKardi Slang", became his first single to appear on a Billboard chart. The second single, "Ol' Time Killin'", was a minor hit. The album received generally favorable reviews from music critics.

Background
In August 2000, Kardinal signed a deal with MCA Records, after the underground success of his EP, Husslin'. The strategy of the MCA project was to license his older material and release it as an album, to familiarize consumers with him. It wasn't meant to be a big-budget album. The album helped introduce the world to the "T-dot sound", and Kardinal's reggae and dancehall-influenced style of hip-hop.

The album's first single was "BaKardi Slang", which appeared on the Billboard Hot Rap Singles chart. In the anthemic song, Kardinal breaks down Toronto's slang. The second single, "Ol' Time Killin'", received heavy rotation on music video channels. A video for "Powerfulll" was released in Canada.

The songs "On wid da Show" and "Husslin'" are previous singles, released in 1997 and 2000 respectively. A remix of "Money Jane", originally released in 2000, also appears on the album. In the song "U R Ghetto 2002", he disses American rapper Bishop for copying his idea, which originated from the song "U R Ghetto When".

Reception

One year after its release, 25,000 copies of the album were sold in Canada. It received generally favorable reviews from music critics. The Source gave the album 3½ out of 5 mics. RapReviews.com gave it a 7/10 rating, calling it a "mixed bag," and stating "there are also some perfect 10's to be found here." The A.V. Club gave the album a favorable review, praising its "impressive musical and lyrical consistency." AllMusic gave it 2½ out of 5 stars, noting that Kardinal "displays only flashes of promise here." The album was nominated for Best Rap Recording at the 2002 Juno Awards.

In 2021, the album won the inaugural edition of CBC Music's Canada Listens competition, a musical version of the CBC's long-running Canada Reads. It was defended by writer and broadcaster Kathleen Newman-Bremang.

Track listing

Samples
"Mic T.H.U.G.S." contains a sample from "Eazy-Duz-It" by Eazy-E
"Ol' Time Killin'" contains samples from "The MC" by KRS-One, "Murderer" by Barrington Levy and "Murder She Wrote" by Chaka Demus & Pliers
"Money Jane" (Remix) contains elements from "Jam on It" by Newcleus
"U R Ghetto 2002" contains elements from "Les Modernes" by Mark Isham
"Go Ahead Den" contains elements from "100% Dundee" by The Roots

Chart positions

Personnel
Kardinal Offishall – producer
Glenn Lewis – performer
Sean Paul – performer
Saukrates – producer
Chris "The Glove" Taylor – mixing

Release history

References

External links
Album credits at Discogs

2001 albums
Albums produced by Kardinal Offishall
Albums produced by Saukrates
Kardinal Offishall albums
MCA Records albums